Bącza Kunina  is a village in the administrative district of Gmina Nawojowa, within Nowy Sącz County, Lesser Poland Voivodeship, in southern Poland.

References

Villages in Nowy Sącz County